BC Statyba was a basketball club from Vilnius, Lithuania. It was renamed to Lietuvos rytas in 1997.

History
In 1963, Vilnius's first basketball club, called Žalgiris, was established. In 1964, the team changed its name to Plastikas, but was renamed to Statyba before the start of the season. In 1965, Statyba became the Žalgiris association champions, and finished third in the Lithuanian cup tournament. The next year they improved and finished in second place in the Lithuanian cup tournament. In 1966, the team made their debut in the USSR A class championship, which was a second-tier championship, where they finished in fourth place. Statyba's most successful season came in 1979, when they finished in third place in the top division – the USSR Premier Basketball League. Over the years, Statyba became one of the biggest rivals for Žalgiris Kaunas. After the leaving the USSR championship, Statyba participated in the Lithuanian championship and the LKF Cup, finishing second in 1991 and 1992. Statyba joined the Lithuanian Basketball League when it was established in the 1993–94 season. Statyba won third place in the inaugural season, but over the next few years, plummeted in the standings, finishing with a disastrous last place finish in the 1996–97 season.

In 1997, the club was purchased by Lietuvos rytas newspaper's owner Gedvydas Vainauskas. He denounced Statyba and its history claiming that his club is not related to Statyba and renamed the club to Statyba-Lietuvos rytas in 1997 and then to Lietuvos rytas in 1998. Many Statyba's players, coaches—present or past—and fans, condemned the actions of new owner and dissociated themselves from the new club.

In 2011, Statyba's fans, players and coaches re-established the club and claimed to be the successors of the old club.

In 2017, under new ownership, Lietuvos rytas took back the history of Statyba.

Notable players

 Dainius Adomaitis 1993–1996
 Romanas Brazdauskis 1983–1984, 1986–1988
 Rimas Girskis 1968–1983
 Artūras Karnišovas 1987–1990
 Jonas Kazlauskas 1973–1985
 Anatolij Kovtun 1986–1987
 Linas Kvedaravičius 1985–1990
 Šarūnas Marčiulionis 1981–1989
 Algimantas Pavilonis 1973–1985
 Alvydas Pazdrazdis 1991–1992
 Alfredas Vainauskas 1979–1990, 1993–1995

Head coaches
  Antanas Paulauskas (1964–1975) (team founder)
  Rimantas Endrijaitis (1975–1987) (former captain)
  Rimas Girskis (1988–1990) (former captain)
  Eduardas Kairys (1990–1992) (former player)
  Rimantas Endrijaitis (1992–1994) (former captain)
  Heino Lill (1994–1995) (former assistant coach)
  Alfredas Vainauskas (1995–1997) (former player)

Achievements
 Žalgiris association
 Champions (1): 1965
 USSR Premier League
 Third place (1): 1979
 LKF Cup
 Runners-up (1): 1990
 LKL
 Third place (1): 1994
 Lithuanian SSR Championship
 Champions (6): 1972, 1973, 1975, 1977, 1981, 1984
 Runners-up (13): 1966, 1968, 1970, 1971, 1976, 1978, 1979, 1980, 1983, 1985, 1991, 1992
 Lithuanian "Sports" Cup
 Champions (5): 1968, 1969, 1981, 1983, 1985
 Runners-up (2): 1984, 1992
 Third place (2): 1965, 1982
 USSR A class
 Champions (2): 1971, 1974
 Runners-up (1): 1973
 Third place (2): 1969, 1970

References

 
Sport in Vilnius
Basketball teams established in 1963
Basketball teams in Lithuania
Basketball teams in the Soviet Union
1963 establishments in Lithuania
1997 disestablishments in Lithuania